Myles Wakefield (born 13 June 1974), is a former professional tennis player from South Africa.  He enjoyed most of his tennis success while playing doubles, achieving a career-high doubles ranking of world No. 46 in 2001. In 2002 he won an ATP doubles tournament in Casablanca, partnering Stephen Huss.

Career finals

Doubles (1 title, 2 runner-ups)

References

External links
 
 

South African people of British descent
Sportspeople from Durban
South African male tennis players
South African people of English descent
Living people
1974 births